Irina Birvagen (born 24 July 1988) is a Kazakhstani former footballer who played as a forward. She has been a member of the Kazakhstan women's national team.

References

1988 births
Living people
Women's association football forwards
Kazakhstani women's footballers
Kazakhstan women's international footballers
CSHVSM-Kairat players
Kazakhstani people of Russian descent